"Sexy Ladies" is the lead single from Ray J's album For the Love of Ray J.

Charts

References

2008 singles
Ray J songs
2008 songs
Songs written by Keith Crouch
Songs written by Ray J